Joe Avezzano (November 17, 1943 – April 5, 2012) was an American football player and coach.  He was the head football coach at Oregon State University from 1980 to 1984, compiling a record of 6–47–2.  Avezzano was later an assistant coach with the Dallas Cowboys and Oakland Raiders of the National Football League (NFL). He also was head coach of the Seamen Milano in the Italian Football League.

Playing career
Avezzano graduated from Jackson High School in Miami, in 1961. He played college football at Florida State University, where he was a center. He was drafted and played professionally in the American Football League for the Boston Patriots in 1966.  Avezzano wore #50 and played in three regular season games for the Patriots during the 1966 AFL season.  He was also on the 1967 preseason roster of the Pittsburgh Steelers, wearing #50.

Coaching career
Avezzano began his coaching career at Washington High School in Massillon, Ohio, and then coached at Florida State, his alma mater, in 1968 and at Iowa State University from 1969 to 1972 under head coach Johnny Majors. He followed Majors to the University of Pittsburgh, where he was offensive line coach from 1973 to 1976, helping the 1976 Panthers to the national championship. Avezzano went with Majors to the University of Tennessee in 1977, where he was the offensive coordinator for three seasons.

Oregon State
In December 1979, Avezanno was hired as a head coach for the first time at Oregon State University in the Pacific-10 Conference. He succeeded Craig Fertig and signed a four-year contract at $40,000 per year. Avezzano's time with the Beavers was less than successful; he had two 14-game losing streaks, separated only by a 31–28 come-from-behind win over Fresno State in 1981 (at the time the greatest comeback in NCAA history, giving him his first victory at OSU) which followed a 0–11 campaign in 1980.

Texas A&M
Avezzano's next job was the offensive line coach at Texas A&M from 1985 to 1988 under head coach Jackie Sherrill, during which time the Aggies won three Southwest Conference titles and two Cotton Bowls. He also served as offensive coordinator for Texas A&M in 1988.

Dallas Cowboys
In 1990, Avezzano was hired by Jimmy Johnson to be the special teams coach for the Dallas Cowboys.

He was honored by his NFL special teams coaching peers for the first time in 1991, being named Special Teams Coach of the Year, when the Cowboys:
 Led the NFC in special teams effectiveness and ranked second in the NFL behind the Oakland Raiders.
 Led the league in special teams touchdowns (3) and average kickoff return (21.7 yards).
 Placed a player in the top three in both punt and kickoff return averages in the same season for the first time in team history. In addition, Alexander Wright's 102 yard kickoff return against the Atlanta Falcons and Kelvin Martin's 85 yard punt return against the Philadelphia Eagles were NFL season-bests.
 Kicker Ken Willis tied a club record with 27 field goals and set another with four 50-yarders.
 Punter Mike Saxon finished tied for fourth in the NFL with a career best 36.8 yard net average.
 Blocked three punts, returning one for a touchdown against the Houston Oilers.
 Recovered an onside kick against the Washington Redskins, forced a safety and recovered two punts fumbled by opponents.

Avezzano won his second NFL Special Teams Coach of the Year award in 1993 when his units helped the Cowboys finish as the only team in the NFL to rank in the Top 10 in the league in all four major kicking game categories.

In 1998, the Cowboys were one of only two teams in the NFL to be ranked in the top 12 in all four major kicking game categories, including leading the league in kickoff coverage (18.5), earning Avezzano his third Special Teams Coach of the Year award.

After the firing of Chan Gailey in 2000, he was considered as one of the candidates to take over the head coaching duties of the Dallas Cowboys, which eventually went to Dave Campo. In 2002, Avezzano served as both the special teams coach of the Cowboys and as the head coach of the Dallas Desperados of the Arena Football League.

Avezzano was not retained by the Cowboys when Bill Parcells became head coach in 2003.

Dallas Desperados (AFL)
While still working for the Dallas Cowboys, he was named the head coach of the inaugural Dallas Desperados team, also owned by Jerry Jones. He remained in that capacity until resigning before the 2004 season, after he accepted an assistant job with the Oakland Raiders. He posted a record of 17–13, and guided the club to two post-season appearances and a division title in the franchise's first two years of existence

Oakland Raiders
Avezzano was hired by Norv Turner as the special teams coach for the Oakland Raiders in 2003. He and Turner coached together with the Cowboys from 1991 to 1993 where they helped Dallas win back-to-back Super Bowls following the 1992 and 1993 seasons.  He coached with the Raiders until Turner's dismissal in 2005.

Seamen Milano (IFL)
In September 2011, Avezzano was announced as the new head coach of the Seamen Milano of the Italian Football League.

Accomplishments
Avezzano is the only three-time winner of the NFL Special Teams Coach of the Year award voted on by NFL special teams coaches.  His units consistently finished near the top of league rankings in all four major kicking game categories—punt return average, kickoff return average, punt coverage and kickoff coverage—while having a penchant for making big plays, blocking 23 kicks and returning 18 punts and kickoffs for touchdowns.

Personal life
Avezzano was a member of Delta Tau Delta fraternity. He was the owner of "Coach Joe's" bar and grill in Frisco, Texas. The restaurant opened in 2007, directly next door to "Randy White's Hall of Fame BBQ" owned by former Dallas Cowboy Randy White. Hat Tricks was another one of Avezzano's establishments, located in Lewisville, Texas.

He also owned the Corpus Christi Sharks of the Arena Football League 2 (AF2) from 2006 to 2009.

Avezzano was married twice, first to fellow Florida State student, Sherry Butcher from 1965 to 1970, then to Diann Avezzano for over 30 years. He and Diann had one son, Tony.

Death
Avezzano died of a heart attack while exercising on a treadmill in Italy.

Head coaching record

College

See also
 List of American Football League players

References

1943 births
2012 deaths
American football centers
Boston Patriots players
Dallas Cowboys coaches
Florida State Seminoles football coaches
Florida State Seminoles football players
Oakland Raiders coaches
Oregon State Beavers football coaches
Pittsburgh Panthers football coaches
Tennessee Volunteers football coaches
Texas A&M Aggies football coaches
American expatriate players of American football
Dallas Desperados coaches
Sportspeople from Yonkers, New York
American Football League players
American people of Italian descent